Birkat Al Awamer is a district in Qatar located in the municipality of Al Wakrah. Manateq Qatar established the Birkat Al Awamer Logistics Park in the district, which spans an area of 9,381,885 m2.

Nearby settlements include Al Afja Mesaieed and Mesaieed to the east and Abu Sulba to the north, and Umm Al Houl to the northeast.

Etymology
The first part of the district's name is derived from the Arabic term "birka", which in Qatar is used to describe a depression that holds water. The second constituent, "awamer", is the name of a local Arab tribe that settled the area.

References

Populated places in Al Wakrah